In computing, tty is a command in Unix and Unix-like operating systems to print the file name of the terminal connected to standard input.

tty stands for TeleTYpewriter.

Usage
The tty command is commonly used to check if the output medium is a terminal. The command prints the file name of the terminal connected to standard input. If no file is detected (in case, it's being run as part of a script or the command is being piped) "not a tty" is printed to stdout and the command exits with an exit status of 1. The command also can be run in silent mode (tty -s) where no output is produced, and the command exits with an appropriate exit status.

See also
 Pseudoterminal
 Teleprinter

References

External links
 
 
 
 
 
 

Unix software